Ecnomophlebia is a monotypic moth genus in the family Geometridae. Its only species, Ecnomophlebia argyrospila, is found in Australia. Both the genus and species were described by Turner in 1941.

References

Larentiinae
Geometridae genera
Monotypic moth genera